Pentraxins (PTX), also known as pentaxins, are an evolutionary conserved family of proteins characterised by containing a pentraxin protein domain. Proteins of the pentraxin family are involved in acute immunological responses. They are a class of pattern recognition receptors (PRRs). They are a superfamily of multifunctional conserved proteins, some of which are components of the humoral arm of innate immunity and behave as functional ancestors of antibodies (Abs). They are known as classical acute phase proteins (APP), known for over a century.

Structure 

Pentraxins are characterised by calcium dependent ligand binding and a distinctive flattened β-jellyroll structure similar to that of the legume lectins. The name "pentraxin" is derived from the Greek word for five (penta) and axle (axis) relating to the radial symmetry of five monomers forming a ring approximately 95Å across and 35Å deep observed in the first members of this family to be identified.  The "short" pentraxins include Serum Amyloid P component (SAP) and C reactive protein (CRP). The "long" pentraxins include PTX3 (a cytokine modulated molecule) and several neuronal pentraxins.

Family members 

Three of the principal members of the pentraxin family are serum proteins: namely, C-reactive protein (CRP), serum amyloid P component protein (SAP), and female protein (FP). PTX3 (or TSG-14) protein is a cytokine-induced protein that is homologous to CRPs and SAPs, but its function has not yet been determined.

C-reactive protein 

C-reactive protein is expressed during acute phase response to tissue injury or inflammation in mammals. The protein resembles antibody and performs several functions associated with host defence: it promotes agglutination, bacterial capsular swelling and phagocytosis, and activates the classical complement pathway through its calcium-dependent binding to phosphocholine. CRPs have also been sequenced in an invertebrate, Limulus polyphemus (Atlantic horseshoe crab), where they are a normal constituent of the hemolymph.

Pentraxin 3 
Pentraxin 3 (PTX3) is an acute phase protein whose levels rise during severe infections in humans. In case of central nervous system infections PTX3 helps distinguishes between bacterial and aseptic meningoencephalitis. It is significantly higher in bacterial meningoencephalitis.

Serum amyloid P component 

Serum amyloid P component is a vertebrate protein that is identical to tissue forms of amyloid P component. It is found in all types of amyloid deposits, in glomerular basement membrane and in elastic fibres in blood vessels. SAP binds to various lipoprotein ligands in a calcium-dependent manner, and it has been suggested that, in mammals, this may have important implications in atherosclerosis and amyloidosis.

Hamster female protein 

Hamster female protein is a SAP homologue found in Mesocricetus auratus (Golden hamster). The concentration of this plasma protein is altered by sex steroids and stimuli that elicit an acute phase response.

Nervous system 

Pentraxin proteins expressed in the nervous system are neural pentraxin I (NPTXI) and II (NPTXII). NPTXI and NPTXII are homologous and can exist within one species. It is suggested that both proteins mediate the uptake of synaptic macromolecules and play a role in synaptic plasticity. Apexin, a sperm acrosomal protein, is a homologue of NPTXII found in Cavia porcellus (Guinea pig).

Human 

Human genes encoding proteins that contain this domain include:
 APCS
 CRP
 GPR144
 NPTX1; NPTX2; NPTXR
 PTX3
 SVEP1

References 

Protein families
Protein domains
Single-pass transmembrane proteins